Julio César Meza (born in Cartagena de indias, Colombia in 1983) also known as Julio Meza is a Colombian singer. In 2005, he won the first ever Colombian edition of The X Factor entitled El factor X broadcast on RCN TV. He went platinum with his first release after winning El factor X.

Discography

Albums
2006: Luchando
2006: Nuestra Tierra Vol. 2
2009: Culpable

Singles
2006: "Hasta los Huesos"
2006: "Que Sera"
2006: "Me Hiciste Sufrir"
2007: "Solo con Palabras"
2009: "Soñando Despierto"

💫

References

External links
MySpace site

1983 births
Living people
Colombian musicians
The X Factor winners